Pablo Balarezo Moncayo (10 December 1904 – 23 January 1999) was an Ecuadorian poet, journalist and essayist. He was active in the literary and cultural circles of his native city, Ambato, and in those of Quito, Cuenca and Guayaquil.

Works
Poetry:
 Canción de Ternura Estremecida (1964)
 Símbolo y Paisaje de la Ciudad de los Poetas (1946)

References

1904 births
1999 deaths
People from Ambato, Ecuador
Ecuadorian journalists
Male journalists
Ecuadorian poets
Ecuadorian male writers
20th-century poets
20th-century male writers
20th-century journalists